Jiyang is one of 10 urban districts of the prefecture-level city of Jinan, the capital of Shandong Province, East China.

History
In the seventh year of Tianhui of Jin Dynasty (around 1216 ), Emperor Taizong of Jin established the county Jiyang, because it is at the north side of river Ji. After the People's Republic of China was established, Jiyang was annexed by Linyi County in 1958. In 1961, Jiyang County was recovered.

Transportation
Jiyang is 45 kilometers from Jinan city, and transportation is convenient. It is 8 kilometers from Jinan International airport, connected to Jinan city through the third north ring highway of Jinan, the third bridge of Yellow River, and Jinan Yellow River highway bridge. 104, 220 national highways and 248, 249 provincial roads all go through the district.

Administrative divisions
As 2012, this district is divided to 2 subdistricts and 8 towns.
Subdistricts
Jiyang Subdistrict
Jibei Subdistrict

Towns

Climate

Education

Elementary school

Jiyang Jibei Elementary School 济阳县济北小学
Yingcai Elementary School 英才小学
 Tianshan Elementary School 天山小学 
Jiyang Modern Elementary School 济阳现代小学
Jiyang Zhiyuan Elementary School 济阳志远小学

Middle school

Jiyang Chuangxin Middle School 济阳创新中学
Jiyang Jingyeyuan Middle School 竞业园学校 
Jiyang No.10 Middle School 山东省济阳县第十中学

High school

Jiyang No.1 High School 济阳县第一中学 
Jiyang Jibei High School 济阳县济北中学

Local Delicacies
A very famous watermelon called Shaixi watermelon was from Jiyang. It is very small and the flesh color is yellow and Super sweet.

References

External links
 Official home page

Jiyang
Jinan